Glasgow Walker is a 2000 album by Scotland-based singer-songwriter John Martyn. It was his first album to be written on a keyboard rather than a guitar, after a suggestion from his friend Phil Collins. It contains trip hop influences, which Martyn had experimented with on his earlier album And. Kathryn Williams is featured on backing vocals on "Can't Live Without" and "The Field of Play." The album was dedicated to Rod Woolnough.

Glasgow Walker peaked at No. 66 on the UK Albums Chart.

Critical reception
The Birmingham Post called the album "probably [Martyn's] most assured album in a decade, a moving, heart-on-sleeve affair that finds him in fine voice."

Track listing
All tracks composed by John Martyn except where indicated.

"So Sweet" - 4:50
"Wildflower" - 6:24
"The Field of Play" - 5:48
"Cool In This Life" - 4:20
"Feel So Good" - 5:20
"Cry Me a River" (Arthur Hamilton) - 5:45
"Mama T" - 5:52
"Can't Live Without" - 4:12
"The Cat Won't Work Tonight" - 4:57
"You Don't Know What Love Is" (Gene DePaul, Don Raye) - 5:19

References

External links
John Martyn's Website

2000 albums
John Martyn albums
Independiente Records albums